Litoměřice District is a district in the Ústí nad Labem Region of the Czech Republic. Its capital is the town of Litoměřice.

Administrative division
Litoměřice District is divided into three administrative districts of municipalities with extended competence: Litoměřice, Lovosice and Roudnice nad Labem.

List of municipalities
Towns are marked in bold and market towns in italics:

Bechlín -
Bohušovice nad Ohří -
Bříza -
Brňany -
Brozany nad Ohří -
Brzánky -
Budyně nad Ohří -
Býčkovice -
Ctiněves -
Černěves -
Černiv -
Černouček -
Chodouny -
Chodovlice -
Chotěšov -
Chotiměř -
Chotiněves -
Chudoslavice -
Čížkovice -
Děčany -
Dlažkovice -
Dobříň -
Doksany -
Dolánky nad Ohří -
Drahobuz -
Dušníky -
Evaň -
Hlinná -
Horní Beřkovice -
Horní Řepčice -
Hoštka -
Hrobce -
Jenčice -
Kamýk -
Keblice -
Klapý -
Kleneč -
Kostomlaty pod Řípem -
Krabčice -
Křesín -
Křešice -
Kyškovice -
Levín -
Lhotka nad Labem -
Liběšice -
Libkovice pod Řípem -
Libochovany -
Libochovice -
Libotenice -
Litoměřice -
Lkáň -
Lovečkovice -
Lovosice -
Lukavec -
Malé Žernoseky -
Malíč -
Martiněves -
Michalovice -
Miřejovice -
Mlékojedy -
Mnetěš -
Mšené-lázně -
Nové Dvory -
Oleško -
Píšťany -
Ploskovice -
Podsedice -
Polepy -
Prackovice nad Labem -
Přestavlky -
Račice -
Račiněves -
Radovesice -
Rochov -
Roudnice nad Labem -
Sedlec -
Siřejovice -
Slatina -
Snědovice -
Staňkovice -
Štětí -
Straškov-Vodochody -
Sulejovice -
Terezín -
Travčice -
Třebenice -
Trnovany -
Třebívlice -
Třebušín -
Úpohlavy -
Úštěk -
Vchynice -
Vědomice -
Velemín -
Velké Žernoseky -
Vlastislav -
Vražkov -
Vrbičany -
Vrbice -
Vrutice -
Záluží -
Žabovřesky nad Ohří -
Žalhostice -
Židovice -
Žitenice

Geography

Most of the territory is flat and has an agricultural character, but the north is hilly. The territory extends into three geomorphological mesoregions: Lower Eger Table (south), Central Bohemian Uplands (north) and Ralsko Uplands (east). A dominant feature of the southern part of the district is the Říp Mountain.

The most important rivers are the Elbe and its tributary Ohře, which drain the entire territory. The largest body of water is Žernosecké Lake, an artificial lake crated by flooding sandstone quarry. However, there are only a few bodies of water.

České Středohoří is a protected landscape area that extends into the district.

Demographics

Most populated municipalities

Economy
The largest employers with its headquarters in Litoměřice District and at least 500 employers are:

Transport
The D8 motorway from Prague to Ústí nad Labem runs across the district.

Sights

The most important monuments in the district, protected as national cultural monuments, are:
Říp Mountain with the Rotunda of Saint George
Small Fortress in Terezín
Libochovice Castle
Ploskovice Castle
Augustinian monastery in Roudnice nad Labem

The best-preserved settlements, protected as monument reservations and monument zones, are:

Litoměřice (monument reservation)
Terezín (monument reservation)
Úštěk (monument reservation)
Starý Týn (monument reservation)
Budyně nad Ohří
Roudnice nad Labem
Brocno
Chotiněves
Dolní Nezly
Rašovice
Slatina
Soběnice
Srdov

The most visited tourist destination is the Terezín Memorial.

References

External links

Litoměřice District profile on the Czech Statistical Office's website

 
Districts of the Czech Republic